German submarine U-1163 was a Type VIIC/41 U-boat of Nazi Germany's Kriegsmarine during World War II.

She was ordered	on 14 October 1941, and was laid down on 5 December 1942 at Danziger Werft AG, Danzig, as yard number 135. She was launched on 12 June 1943 and commissioned under the command of Oberleutnant zur See Ernst-Ludwig Balduhn on 6 October of that year.

Design
German Type VIIC/41 submarines were preceded by the heavier Type VIIC submarines. U-1163 had a displacement of  when at the surface and  while submerged. She had two shafts and two  propellers.

U-1163 was fitted with five  torpedo tubes (four fitted at the bow and one at the stern), fourteen torpedoes, one  SK C/35 naval gun, (220 rounds), one  Flak M42 and two  C/30 anti-aircraft guns. The boat had a complement of between forty-four and sixty.

Service history

U-1163 did not have a very prosperous career. While she was commissioned on 6 October 1943, it was not until 3 December 1944 that she sank her first (and only) enemy vessel. Despite her lack of ships sunk, U-1163 was one of only a handful of German U-boats in World War II to help shoot down a De Havilland Mosquito on 2 August 1944.

U-1163 spent her first eight months in the Kriegsmarine undergoing training operations with the 8th U-boat Flotilla. At the end of her training, she was formally assigned to the 11th U-boat Flotilla stationed in Norway. She began her first patrol on 13 July 1944, almost a full three years after she was ordered.

First patrol
Following training exercises with the 8th U-boat Flotilla and a journey from Kiel to Flekkefjord Norway, U-1163 began her first official war patrol with the 11th U-boat Flotilla on 13 July 1944. After only seven days at sea however, U-1163 returned to Norway in the coastal town of Arnöy on 19 July.

Second patrol

After her first patrol, U-1163 spent the next three months traveling up the coast of Norway. On 2 August, U-1163 and an accompanying U-boat,  were traveling on the surface from Stavanger to Kristiansand and had the protection of surface escorts as well. Yet despite all of the measures, two de Havilland Mosquitos (E/333 and S/333) attacked the two U-boats. S/333 was shot down by anti-aircraft fire during the attack and the two U-boats were undamaged.

On 15 October 1944, U-1163 began her second war patrol after leaving Bogenbucht. For 17 days, U-1163 roamed the Arctic Ocean in search of any Allied convoys heading to the Soviet Union. On 31 October, after not a single engagement with any enemy vessels, U-1163 entered Hammerfest, Norway.

Third patrol
U-1163's third patrol began on 25 November 1944 after she left the port city of Kilbotn. For 22 days, she traveled through the Arctic Ocean in search of any Allied vessels heading to or from the Soviet Union. On 3 December 1944, U-1163 claimed the only enemy vessel in her career. , a Soviet 433 GRT cargo steam ship, had been separated from her convoy after developing engine trouble, and was stopped, protected by a single minesweeper. The U-1163 hit the Revoljucija with a single torpedo, sinking her along with her 23 crew. Thirteen days later, on 16 December, U-1163 returned to Bogenbucht.

Fourth patrol
The last patrol that U-1163 took part in began on 15 April 1945. She left Kristiansand that day and traveled to the north coast of Ireland. After 25 days at sea, returned to Marvika, Norway where she was handed over to the Allies following the surrender of all German forces a few days before.

Summary of raiding history

See also
 Battle of the Atlantic (1939-1945)

References

Bibliography

External links

German Type VIIC/41 submarines
U-boats commissioned in 1944
U-boats sunk in 1945
World War II submarines of Germany
1944 ships
World War II shipwrecks in the North Sea
U-boats sunk by British aircraft
Ships built in Danzig
Operation Deadlight
Maritime incidents in December 1945
Submarines sunk by aircraft as targets